Jason-Antigone Dane (Dhousis) is a Greek LGBT rights activist.

Early years 

Dane was born in Athens, Greece in the 13th of August 1985 and raised in the neighborhood of Kolonaki. Dane graduated from Athens College, then joined the 2nd experimental Lyceum of Athens, and went on to graduate from the Department of Theatre Studies at the University of Patras with honours. Dane continued studies in theatre, joining the drama school of Roula Pateraki, graduating with honours, and later moved to London, working in famous gay clubs and becoming more interested and active in human and animal rights and veganism. Later, Dane returned to Greece to study human rights at the University of Athens.

Activism

Nude activism 
After returning to Greece, Dane created tension in the gay community with naked protests that included slogans written on their naked body. Dane changed names by adding the name Antigone (from the mythic heroine) next to the baptismal first name Jason.

ID trail 
In November 2017, Dane took legal steps to ask to legally be referred as gender neutral, with gender erased from Dane's ID. That came one month after a bill was passed from the Parliament to allow people to change the gender on their identity cards. However, Dane wanted gender to be erased entirely. Dane was the first person to ask for official recognition as a non-binary person. Dane is genderqueer. During the hearing, Dane was accompanied by Grigoris Valianatos.

In February 2018, the court ruled in favour of allowing Dane to identify as a non-binary person on identity cards, but not to totally erase gender from the cards.

Bill on LGBT adoption 
Dane was under the spotlight of mass media when attending the House of the Hellenic Parliament for LGBT adoption on May 9, 2018. During the hearing, MP Kostas Katsikis stated that homosexuality was a crime equal to pedophilia. Dane left the house as a sign of disapproval.

Candidate councilor in Athens 

Dane is a candidate councillor in Athens, with Rena Dourou, affiliated with the governing Coalition of the Radical Left (Syriza).  Dane is an admirer of Alexis Tsipras.

References

Sources

External links
Interview  at the Night Show, ANT1 TV.

1980s births
Living people
People with non-binary gender identities
Greek LGBT rights activists
Politicians from Athens
University of Patras alumni
Non-binary activists